Gloria Ana Chevesich Ruiz  (born 4 November 1958) is a Chilean lawyer and judge.

Career
Gloria Ana Chevesich graduated from the Law School of the University of Chile. In March 1995, she was appointed rapporteur of the plenary of the Supreme Court. In that role, she participated in the process of lifting the parliamentary immunity of Augusto Pinochet, and was responsible for drafting the court's ruling.

In October 2002, she was appointed minister of the Court of Appeals of Santiago. There she became known for assuming, on behalf of the Supreme Court, the investigation of the corruption case known as "MOP-Gate". This took over seven years to complete and resulted in the conviction of fourteen defendants, including former Public Works minister Carlos Cruz Lorenzen, who was sentenced to three years in prison and a fine of 799 million pesos (1.2 million US dollars).

Chevesich became president of the Court of Santiago for the judicial year 2013, succeeding Minister Iván Villarroel.

At the end of May 2013, President Sebastián Piñera nominated her to join the Supreme Court, a decision that was ratified by the Senate on 3 July. On 3 August 2013, she was sworn in as a new minister of the Supreme Court, becoming the fourth woman to do so, leaving the presidency of the Court of Appeals of Santiago in the hands of Minister Juan Escobar Zepeda.

Personal life
While studying at the university, Gloria Ana Chevesich met Andrés de la Maza Camus, with whom she had a relationship for two years, until they married in 1979. The couple had two daughters. Her husband died in July 2004.

References

1958 births
20th-century Chilean lawyers
21st-century Chilean lawyers
Chilean women lawyers
Living people
Supreme Court of Chile members
University of Chile alumni
20th-century women lawyers
21st-century women lawyers
Serbs in South America